The 2010 Big East women's basketball tournament took place in March 2010 at the XL Center in Hartford, Connecticut. The winner will receive the Big East Conference's automatic bid to the 2010 NCAA tournament. This was the second consecutive year Big East tournament to include all 16 of the conference's teams. The teams finishing 9 through 16 in the regular season standings played first round games, while teams 5 through 8 received byes to the second round. The top 4 teams during the regular season received double-byes to the quarterfinals.

During the tournament, top-ranked Connecticut broke its own NCAA record for consecutive wins. The Huskies extended their streak to a record-setting 71 with a 59–44 win over Notre Dame in the semifinals. The Huskies went on to win the tournament with a 60–32 pasting of West Virginia.

Final regular season standings

‡ Regular season Big East champion

Bracket

Championship game

Big East women's basketball tournament
 Tournament